His Debt is a 1919 American silent drama film directed by William Worthington and produced by Haworth Pictures Corporation.

Plot
As described in a film magazine, Goto Mariyama (Hayakawa), Japanese owner of a fashionable gambling house, accepts the worthless check of Blair Whitcomb (McDonald), who has lost his fortune at the gaming table. Whitcomb makes an attempt on Mariyama's life. Gloria Manning (Novak), Whitcomb's fiance, is a nurse and saves Mariyama's life. He is about to propose marriage when he learns of her engagement. Much as he loves her, he still is determined to have his revenge upon Whitcomb. When the police come to take Whitcomb prisoner, so earnestly does Gloria plead for her sweetheart, even after she learns of his guilt, that Mariyama relents.

Cast
Sessue Hayakawa as Goto Mariyama
Jane Novak as Gloria Manning
Francis McDonald as Blair Whitcomb
Fred Montague as J.P. Manning

References

External links 

 

Films directed by William Worthington
Haworth Pictures Corporation films
1919 drama films
1919 films
American silent feature films
American black-and-white films
Silent American drama films
Film Booking Offices of America films
1910s American films